Mike Stone (born June 29, 1943) is an American martial artist, retired karate fighter, fight choreographer, stuntman, actor, author, and motivational speaker.

Biography
Mike Stone was born in Makawao, Maui, Hawaii. Stone's first introduction to the martial arts was in Aikido while as a student Lahainaluna High School. After graduating Stone enlisted in the US Army in 1962. Stone began studying  Shorin-ryu Karate earning his black belt in only six months under Herbert Peters while stationed at Fort Chaffee in Arkansas. Well known for his karate tournament success in the 1960s, Stone known for his aggressiveness earned the nicknamed "The Animal" would amass a record of 91 consecutive wins.
In 1964, Stone won the sparring grand championship at the first ever International Karate Championships in Long Beach, California. Stone has authored several books, most notably Mike Stone's Book of American Eclectic Karate.

Stone met Elvis and Priscilla Presley in 1968 at the Mainland vs. Hawaii Karate Championships promoted by Elvis' longtime karate instructor Ed Parker. Stone had a young child and a pregnant wife. Stone had been working as a bodyguard for record producer Phil Spector. After the show, Elvis invited Stone back to the couple's penthouse suite where Elvis suggested that Priscilla train with Stone. Three weeks later Priscilla made the 45-minute drive to Stone's school in Huntington Beach. Because of the distance Priscilla opted to train with Chuck Norris who had a school in West Los Angeles, which was closer to the Presley home. Stone would make occasional trips to Norris's school to train Priscilla. The relationship soon turned romantic, contributing to Elvis and Priscilla's split in February 1972 and divorce in 1973. Stone and Priscilla would eventually split up because he sold a story to the Globe tabloid entitled "How I Stole Elvis Presley's Wife From Him". Priscilla said she split with Stone then, "because he went to the press".

Karate career highlights
In 1963, Stone won the Southwest Karate Championship in the black belt division. The promoter was Allen Steen, who held victories over Stone and Chuck Norris. At Ed Parker's 1964 Internationals Karate Championship, Stone defeated Harry Keolanui in the finals to become Grand Champion. In Chicago that same year, Stone scored victories over Ray Cooper and Mills Crenshaw to win the First World Karate Tournament. At the U.S. National Karate Championships in 1965, Stone won the championship by beating Walter Worthy. Also that year, Stone again won Ed Parker's International Karate Championship by defeating Art Pelela and Tony Tulleners. Three years later, Stone won the World Professional Karate Championship on November 24, 1968 by beating Bob Taian by points decision. In 1969 at the U.S. National Karate Championship, Stone lost an upset decision to Victor Moore.

Personal life
Stone has been married three times. He met his first wife, Mary Ann Dobbs, while in the army stationed at Fort Chaffee. He met his second wife, Francine Doxey in Newport Beach where he was working as a bouncer. In 1985, Stone sold all his possessions and moved to an isolated island in the Philippines where he and his current wife Taina live.

References

Living people
American male karateka
Lahainaluna School alumni
Shōrin-ryū practitioners
1943 births
People from Maui County, Hawaii
Sportspeople from Hawaii